The Ballad of Esequiel Hernández is a 2007 American documentary film that investigates the murky killing of Esequiel Hernández Jr by US Marines. It is written and directed by Kieran Fitzgerald and narrated by Tommy Lee Jones.

Cast
Tommy Lee Jones - Narrator
James Blood - self
David Castaneda - self
Randall Cater - self
Mike Coyne - self
Danny Dominguez - self
Izdiel Garcia - self
Michael Gross - self
Esequiel Hernandez Sr. - self
Margarito Hernandez - self
Richard Jerome - self
Jane Kelly - self
Terry Kincaid - self
Amanda Lichtenberg - self
Enrique Madrid - self
Christine Manriquez - self
David Marquez - self
John McGee - self
Teresaa Todd - self
Roy Torrez Jr. - self
Albert Valadez - self
Roland Wieler - self
Jack Zimmermann - self

Release and reception
It won best-documentary awards at the Mexico City Film Festival in 2007, the Santa Fe Film Festival in 2007 and at the El Paso festival in 2008.

References

External links

2000s Spanish-language films
American documentary films
2007 documentary films
2007 films
Films about the United States Marine Corps
Films set in Texas
Documentary films about crime in the United States
2000s American films